Men's shot put events for wheelchair athletes were held at the 2004 Summer Paralympics in the Athens Olympic Stadium. Events were held in six disability classes.

F52

The F52 event was won by Peter Martin, representing .

22 Sept. 2004, 18:15

F53

The F53 event was won by Mauro Maximo de Jesus, representing .

23 Sept. 2004, 18:30

F54

The F54 event was won by Georg Tischler, representing .

24 Sept. 2004, 18:45

F56

The F56 event was won by Krzysztof Smorszczewski, representing .

25 Sept. 2004, 18:30

F57

The F57 event was won by Michael Louwrens, representing .

26 Sept. 2004, 18:30

F58

The F58 event was won by Ibrahim Allam, representing .

27 Sept. 2004, 17:45

References

M